Kourtney Eugene Brown (born February 9, 1984) is a Bahamian-American actor, television host, model and visual artist. He is best known for starring  in Twentieth Century Fox's My Network TV game show, My Games Fever.

Biography 
Kourtney Brown was born in Miami, Florida and raised in New Providence, Bahamas, in the capital city of Nassau.  He is the youngest of four sons to a Bahamian father and a mother of African, Bahamian and Native American descent. He is a first cousin to the first Bahamian Olympic Medalist, Frank Rutherford and second cousin to Academy Award Winner, Sidney Poitier. Brown received a scholarship to the College of the Bahamas summer fine arts program at age 10. He made his film debut at age 11 when auditioning and landing a minor, one lined role in Flipper, starring Elijah Wood, released summer of 1996. Shortly thereafter, his father fell ill and died. He graduated from St. Andrew's International School of the Bahamas in 2002, where he studied drama and fine art. Brown returned to South Florida with plans to enroll in a University for the arts. These were postponed, upon being discovered by a model and talent scout. In 2003, at age 19, Brown was selected as the face of MTV's "TRL" summer campaign. He has participated in an array of film, TV and commercial projects, including being a martial arts stuntman on the UPN television show, South Beach. Since, Brown has starred in commercials for MTV, Nokia and Kentucky Fried Chicken, became the face of Sean Jean's "Unforgivable" cologne spray Viacom campaign and starred in My Games Fever, a tea hour, commercial daytime TV gameshow on Fox affiliated My Network TV stations. Throughout his career, he has starred in national and international campaign advertisements for "Kentucky Fried Chicken", "KFC Wrap Star", "Nokia", "Vehix", "Days Inn", "MTV", "Office Depot", "Jamba Juice", "Lilt U.K.: Fruit Crush", "El Dorado Furniture", "Sean Jean: Unforgivable", "Optimum Wifi", "Tobacco Free" and "William Rast" by Justin Timberlake. He received a role in Italian foreign film, Fidanzata di Papà, La (Daddy's Girlfriend). Brown currently signed with Wilhelmina Models, has appeared on the runway at Miami Fashion Week and in several print campaigns for international designers. He received a Bachelor's Degree in Visual Arts and Entertainment from Miami International University of Art and Design in 2009 and specializes in figurative ceramic sculpture. Brown was selected as the face of the renown French cognac, "Hennessy" for the company's 2011 national print ad campaign. The ad appeared on billboards, nationally and in various high end magazines, including "GQ", "ESPN", "Maxim" and "Uptown". In 2011 Started his own philanthropic design company, Kreosart by Kourtney Eugene Brown, also known as Kreosart LLC.

Filmography

Actor
If You Only Knew

Fine art career
Kourtney is an acclaimed visual artist and achieved fame in South Florida from the permanent, public installation of his monumental work "Creos Aetas", a 20 ft x 20 ft permanent clock tower installation on the Historic Borinquen Medical Healthcare Center and "Rainforest" Mural at Parrot Jungle Island Park's Serpentarium, Miami Beach, Florida

References 
Official Website
Kourtney Brown Wilhelmina Profile
Kourtney Eugene Brown South Florida Times
Kourtney Brown - VH1 Celebrity
Kourtney Struts His Stuff - The Nassau Guardian Article 1st Half
Kourtney Struts His Stuff - The Nassau Guardian Article 2nd Half

External links 

1984 births
Living people
American people of Bahamian descent
Bahamian male film actors
21st-century American male actors
Male models from Florida
Male actors from Miami
American television hosts
American women television presenters
People from Nassau, Bahamas